"Treehouse of Horror XVI" is the fourth episode of the seventeenth season of the American animated television series The Simpsons. It first aired on the Fox network in the United States on November 6, 2005. In the sixteenth annual Treehouse of Horror, the Simpsons replace Bart with a robot son after Bart falls into a coma, Homer and various other male characters find themselves on a reality show where Mr. Burns hunts humans for sport, and costumed Springfieldians become whatever they are wearing, thanks to a witch who was disqualified from a Halloween costume contest.

This was the first Treehouse of Horror episode since Treehouse of Horror X not to also serve as the season premiere. It was written by Marc Wilmore and directed by David Silverman. Terry Bradshaw and Dennis Rodman guest star as themselves. Around 11.63 million Americans tuned in to watch the episode during its original broadcast.

Plot
In the opening, Kang hopes to speed up an exceedingly slow and boring baseball game, despite Kodos' protests, but ends up destroying the universe when the baseball players go so fast, they turn into a killer vortex which sucks up the universe, even God. When Kodos berates Kang off-camera for destroying the universe, Kang responds by leaving a post-it note on the white void, revealing the title of the episode.

B.I. Bartificial Intelligence
In this spoof of A.I. Artificial Intelligence, Bart winds up in a deep coma after attempting to jump out of a window into a swimming pool. The family takes in a robotic boy, named David, who quickly proves to be a better son. Bart soon wakes up from his coma and competes against David for the affection of the rest of his family. However, Bart is dumped on a road by Homer, who decides to keep David instead. When Bart finds a group of old rusty robots, he steals their parts to become a cyborg. Angry that Homer abandoned him, he then returns home and cuts through both David and Homer with a chainsaw after the robot tries to use Homer as a shield. Although the family is now together again, Homer is angry that he has to be fused with David's lower half, which soon collapses due to Homer's weight. Suddenly, the whole scenario is revealed to be a dream conjured by Homer's demonically possessed mind as he is being exorcised. Marge reluctantly says she will call work and tell them Homer cannot make it in, much to his delight.

Survival of the Fattest
In a parody of the 1924 Richard Connell short story "The Most Dangerous Game", men from Springfield arrive at Mr. Burns' mansion to go hunting. Unbeknownst to them, they are the prey to be hunted, with Burns pledging that if they survive by noon the following day, they will be free to go home. The hunt is broadcast on live television as The World Series of Manslaughter, with Terry Bradshaw as a guest analyst. Homer manages to survive the night while the others are killed left and right, but Burns closes in on him in the morning. Just as he is about to be shot, Burns and Smithers are knocked out by Marge with a frying pan in each hand, who then hits Homer on the head for being away from home for 18 hours without calling, before they end up having make-up sex behind the astonished Bradshaw.

I've Grown a Costume on Your Face
In a parody of The Twilight Zone episode "The Masks", the citizens of Springfield dress in their Halloween costumes for a semi-annual contest party. The winner is declared to be a strange old green-skinned witch. When given the award and asked who she is, she is forced to admit that she is a real witch. As a result, her reward is rescinded because she is not in actual costume. In anger over losing her gift certificate, she turns everyone into their costumed characters, including transforming Homer into a decapitated human, Marge into a skeleton, Bart into a werewolf, Lisa into Albert Einstein, Dr. Hibbert into Count Dracula, Apu into R2-D2 and Hans Moleman into a mole (though he complains that he wasn't wearing a costume). The only person who can reverse the spell is Maggie, who was dressed as a witch. Instead of reversing the spell, Maggie turns them all into pacifiers with their normal heads and then flies off on a broom. The segment ends as Moe and a transformed Dennis Rodman talk to the audience about the importance of reading.

References

External links

Treehouse of Horror XVI script at Springfield! Springfield!

The Simpsons (season 17) episodes
2005 American television episodes
Television episodes about cannibalism
Treehouse of Horror
Television episodes about witchcraft
Fiction about death games
Television episodes about the end of the universe
Science fiction comedy
Television episodes about androids
Television episodes about cyborgs
Television episodes about exorcism
Hunting in popular culture
Television episodes about nightmares
Halloween television episodes